Ludwig Willems (born 7 February 1966 in Herentals) is a Belgian former cyclist.

Major results
1988
1st Stage 6 Tour de l'Avenir
1994
3rd Dwars door Vlaanderen
8th Paris–Roubaix

References

1966 births
Living people
Belgian male cyclists
People from Herentals
Sportspeople from Antwerp Province